The Sampari-class fast attack craft are a class of domestically designed and built fast attack craft operated by the Indonesian Navy. The ships also known as KCR-60M and all ships built by local company PT. PAL in Surabaya. These ships are made with composition of aluminium and high-tensile steel in hull parts which are also a domestic product obtained from state-owned foundry PT. Krakatau Steel in Cilegon.

History

Design problem
The Sampari class Batch-I vessels have a relatively weak radar cross section (RCS). The BPPT Indonesia mentioned weaknesses in the shape of the upper building and the hull that were easily detected by enemy radar. The influence of electro-magnetic wave interference on the installation of several communication antennas on the ship will reduce the antenna performance in communication.

For the maneuverability, the Batch-I ships are also considered less reliable to deal with in high waves on the ocean because the ships' size and the lack of fin stabilizer. This reduces the sea state-level capability of the ships. The endurance is also low as the ships can only operate on patrol for eight days.

The class were also smaller than required by the Indonesia Navy. To overcome these problem, BPPT Indonesia made some recommendations to improve the design of the Batch-II and Batch-III Sampari class.

Characteristics

Radars
The first two of the Sampari class (Hull 628 & 629) are equipped with Chinese-made SR-47 search radar and TR-47 fire control radar. The later version were equipped with Danish Terma-made SCANTER 4603 X-Band radar and C-Fire electro-optical fire control system.

Guns
Indonesia originally planned to arm the Sampari class with a 57mm gun as the main armament but due to budget constraints, all four ships were initially armed with a Bofors 40 mm L/70 as the main gun, possibly taken from retired ships like KRI Teluk Semangka (512) LST. For the secondary gun, the ships are armed with two Yugoimport-SDPR M71/08 20mm cannon at the rear. In 2018, there are plan to replace the Bofors 40mm with the Bofors 57mm L/70 Mk.3. It is later confirmed that KRI Sampari (628) and KRI Tombak (629) old 40mm Bofors are going to be replaced with Russian made Burevestnik 57mm AU-220M Naval RCWS, while the following batch that already incorporated with western subsystem and CMS from Terma will use BAE System Bofors 57mm Mk.3 instead. On 2018, KRI Sampari and KRI Tombak were modified to give room for the installation of TR-47C fire control radar behind the main mast and one NG-18 (H/PJ-13) 30mm CIWS at the stern.

Missiles
The first two of the Sampari class vessels (Hull 628 & 629) are equipped with four C-705 anti-ship missiles. The later batch of this class are expected to be fitted with MBDA anti ship missile solution (Exocet MM40 Block 3).

Ships of the class

References

 
Ship classes of the Indonesian Navy
Fast attack craft